Ciara O'Connor is a camogie player, winner of All-Ireland Senior medals in 2010 and 2011 and an Intermediate Soaring Star award in 2011.

Other awards
She captained Wexford to the National League Div two title in 2009. Daughter of Teddy O'Connor, All-Ireland senior medal winner with Wexford in 1968. Her sister, Aoife, was the senior team captain in 2010 and is married to Declan Ruth. Three other sisters - Niamh, Claire and Eimear - all won National League Division medals with Wexford.

References

External links
 Camogie.ie Official Camogie Association Website
 Wexford Wexford camogie site

Living people
Wexford camogie players
Year of birth missing (living people)